Shalaurov may refer to:

 Nikita Shalaurov, a Russian merchant and Arctic explorer
 Shalaurov Island, in the East Siberian Sea